Burbur (also Romanized as Burbūr; also known as Būrbūr-e Kord and Būrbūr Kord) is a village in Badranlu Rural District, in the Central District of Bojnord County, North Khorasan Province, Iran. At the 2006 census, its population was 986, in 221 families.

References 

Populated places in Bojnord County